Amata chromatica is a species of moth of the subfamily Arctiinae first described by Alfred Jefferis Turner in 1905. It is found in Australia.

References 

chromatica
Moths of Australia